Spring Park can refer to several different places:

Places
Canada
 Spring Park, Prince Edward Island

United States
 Spring Park, Minnesota

United Kingdom
 Spring Park, Croydon